The men's decathlon competition at the 2018 Asian Games took place on 25 and 26 August 2018 at the Gelora Bung Karno Stadium.

Schedule
All times are Western Indonesia Time (UTC+07:00)

Records

Results
Legend
DNF — Did not finish
DNS — Did not start

100 metres 
 Wind – Heat 1: +1.6 m/s
 Wind – Heat 2: +1.5 m/s

Long jump

Shot put

High jump

400 metres

110 metres hurdles
 Wind – Heat 1: −0.8 m/s
 Wind – Heat 2: 0.0 m/s

Discus throw

Pole vault

Javelin throw

1500 metres

Summary

References

Men's decathlon
2018